Khinchin's theorem may refer to any of several different results by Aleksandr Khinchin:

Wiener–Khinchin theorem
Khinchin's constant
Khinchin's theorem on the factorization of distributions
Khinchin's theorem on Diophantine approximations